Nathalie Makoma (born February 24, 1982), is a Congolese Dutch singer-songwriter. She was the lead singer for the group Makoma and she later embarked on a solo musical career on her own.

She took part in the Dutch Idols singing competition in its fourth season reaching the final and finishing as runner-up to Nikki Kerkhof. As a result, she was signed to Sony BMG. She also took part in Dutch Dancing With the Stars coming second (2009), in De Mattheus Masterclass.

Career
In Nouveau Testament / Makoma
Nathalie Makoma started singing with her family group in 1993 when the band was known as "Nouveau Testament". The group was renamed Makoma and was made up of seven members (three brothers, three sisters and one non-family, whom is also one of her sister's boyfriend). They were very successful singing in Lingala language and in English and French as well.

When Nathalie was fourteen, she moved back to the Netherlands with her family and started studying Onstage Performance at the Rockacademie in Tilburg. At the same time the Makoma band kept on performing becoming more successful and travelling around the whole world. Due to the success of the band, Nathalie had to quit her education.

In 2002, the group won the Best African Music Group, at Kora South African Music Awards. and they had worldwide success in gospel music.

Initial solo career
Being the main vocalist, Nathalie also tried to develop a solo music career starting 2002 with her initial album On Faith (2002). The album was rereleased as GoGospel Edition (2003) with additional tracks. In 2004, she left Makoma to get established in England and later in Ireland. In 2005, she released a second solo album called I Saw the Light.

Reality television

Idols
In 2007-2008, she returned to the Netherlands to take part in season 4 of Dutch Idols and finished runner-up to the eventual winner Nikki Kerkhof. The jury called her the "new Tina Turner" and "a real dancing queen". During the competition, her family group Makoma made a guest appearance on the competition final with Nathalie singing "Ola Olé" in English with her. After Idols, Nathalie signed a record deal with Sony BMG and toured the Netherlands, performing in more than 150 shows in one year.

Dancing With the Stars
In 2009, Nathalie took part in the Dutch version of the Dancing With the Stars with her dance partner Peter. She reached the final, and finished second to former Idols-winner Jamai Loman and his partner Gwyneth van Rijn.

De Mattheus Masterclass
In 2010 took part in the second season of the program De Mattheus Masterclass of non-classically trained artists, to perform music by Bach at the church St. Vituskerk in Hilversum.

Solo career
In December 2008, she participated in the RTL 4 program Alles is kerst. In the show she sang with singer Brace the song "All I Want for Christmas Is You" from Mariah Carey.

Nathalie's main single after Idols was "I Won't Forget", a song that was also remixed by DJ Paul van Dyk. The song was included in Nathalie's solo album Dance4Life. A second single "I Just Wanna Dance", an R&B, pop and dance track followed.

In 2010 she left the Sony BMG, and she is currently unsigned singer who is hoping to make Worldwide Music. She signed 2014 to her own record label  NM HOUSE MUSIC and released her new single "One More Try" in August 2014.

Discography

Albums with Makoma
(For details and track lists of albums with Makoma, see Makoma discography)
1999: Nzambe na Bomoyi (Jesus For Life)
2000: Makoma
2000: Baby Come
2002: Mokonzi na Bakonzi (King of Kings)
2005: Na Nzambe Te, Bomoyi Te (also known as No Jesus, No Life)

Nathalie Makoma solo albums
2002: On Faith
Track list:
"Time Is a Healer"
"Rhythm of Your Love"
"On Faith"
"Fools Dust"
"Talk With God"
"Listen to Your Heart"
"You"
"Rolling to the Top"
"Out of the Darkness"
"Time Has Come"
"My Love Is True"
"I Can See the Light"

2003: On Faith—GoGospel Edition
Same track list plus bonus tracks
"Wanna Let You Know"
"Tala Ndenge (The Prayer)"
"Talk With God" [live] (Gogospel version)
"Talk With God" [live] (Gogospel version reprise)

2005: I Saw the Light
Track list:
"I'm Glad I'm Alive"
"You've Got a Friend"
"Looking at Myself"
"My Way"
"Lover Be Thy Name"
"There Will Be a Light"
"I Understand"
"Stay"
"Love You in My Life"
"To Be the One"
"I'll Be There"
"I Will Bless You"
"Amazing Grace"

Albums as Makoma featuring Nathalie Makoma
My Sweet Lord (2000)

EPs
2005: I'm Glad I'm Alive (live)
Track list
I'm Glad I'm Alive"
"I'm Glad I'm Alive" (A Version)
"To Be the One"

Singles

1: "I Won't Forget" reached number 2 on the Dutch Tipparade, which is equivalent to the position number 42 in the Dutch Top 40.
2: "I Just Wanna Dance" reached number 17 on the Dutch Tipparade, which is equivalent to the position number 57 in the Dutch Top 40.

Featured in

See also
Makoma

References

External links

Nathalie Makoma Official website
Natahlie Makoma earlier official website
Nathalie Makoma MySpace
Nathalie Makoma Twitter

1989 births
Living people
People from Kinshasa
Democratic Republic of the Congo emigrants to the Netherlands
21st-century Democratic Republic of the Congo women singers
Dutch pop singers
Dutch Christians
Democratic Republic of the Congo Christians
Idols (franchise) participants
21st-century Dutch women singers
21st-century Dutch singers